Anbulla Rajinikanth is a 1984 Indian Tamil-language children's drama film directed by K. Natraj in his debut. The film stars Rajinikanth as himself, Meena, and Ambika. It was released on 2 August 1984, and received positive reviews, with praise for Meena's performance and Rajinikanth's acting. Despite this, the film was a box-office bomb.

Plot 

Rosy, a girl with a left arm paralysed and weak cardiac health, lives at an orphanage along with others that were given up by their parents due to disabilities or having no parents, or for other reasons. Having been disowned by her parents for untold reasons since her birth and her inability to be like other normal children attributes to her rudeness. She even ill-treats all her caretakers, which leads to hatefulness towards her by almost all other orphanage workers and orphan children, except Mother Superior, who heads the orphanage and is always kind to everyone regardless of their age. Lalitha arrives at the orphanage as a babysitter. She is assigned to take care of Rosy by Mother Superior. She, unlike any other caretakers, takes care of Rosy despite her rudeness and shows extra care for her like a real mother herself, which even surprises Mother Superior as the older caretakers gave up and sidelined when it came to taking care of Rosy, owing to her arrogance.

It is informed that actor Rajinikanth would one day visit the orphanage as a guest to entertain children on a special occasion under the permission of Mother Superior, who sought to bring change to everyone in the orphanage. Rajinikanth arrives and distributes sweets to every child and staff kindly. But when Rosy's turn comes, she rudely disregards his gifts. While this infuriates everyone around, Rajinikanth imbibes ignominy caused by Rosy's behaviour since her is a child, and still continues being calm and positive. He announces that he will freely showcase his newly released film Annai Oru Aalayam. Rosy, however, not only earns everyone's disgust for her actions, but on the inside also feels saddened that she herself did this, which even made her more grumpy.

Later that night, Rosy avoids the film screening. However, she gets interested as she hears it over the window. After a glimpse of a few scenes of it from the window, she goes on to watch the whole film, wherein the protagonist saves a baby elephant from poachers and reunites it with its mother, displaying parental love, which affects Rosy in terms of sentiments that makes her want to apologise for her unkind acts. The next day, she displays a change, to everyone's awe. She apologises to Rajinikanth through a letter, saying that this film was the reason for her to change her perspective towards her nature, which Rajinikanth swiftly agrees to and replies to her, reciprocating his kindness. Having found herself to have become a bigger fan of Rajinikanth, Rosy obsesses about her favourite superstar. Mother Superior, happy on this change of Rosy, requests to Rajinikanth herself, to which he kindly obliges.

Rajinikanth again returns one day and sets up a play with K. Bhagyaraj, obliging for Mother Superior's request to please the kids. There, he and Rosy bond with each other, which extends to limits where Rajinikanth takes Rosy almost everywhere, even to his shoots of new films. One day, at the orphanage with Rajnikanth, Rosy coughs up blood and faints. The doctor finds out that Rosy has a weak heart and reveals that she has just a few days left to live, shocking Lalitha and Rajinikanth. Rajinikanth vows to keep Rosy happy for the rest of her life and approaches senior doctors for help. Lalitha reveals that she is the real mother of Rosy when Mother superior and her have a confrontation in private. She had to give up her daughter because of her family and the loss of her husband, Raju. Mother Superior had consulted doctors as early as when Rosy was only a baby, only to be told that the medical issue cannot be cured even by modern advances.

Knowing that Rosy was reaching the end of her life, Mother Superior seeks the help of Rajnikanth so that she finds solace in him that she remains happy, let alone the fact of how long she would survive. Rosy demands Rajinikanth once to come and celebrate Christmas as Santa Claus, such that nobody realises. On Christmas Eve, Rajinikanth does as Rosy's wish, soon after which he reveals himself. Overjoyed, Rosy laughs so hard out of happiness that she once again coughs up blood and faints. Realizing that night was her last one, everyone gathers around crying, especially Rosy's friends, who started to like her ever since the change in her attitude that they were going to miss her forever. On that sad moment, she also reveals that she was aware that Lalitha was her real mother, which makes everyone go into shock. Holding her idol's hand, Rosy dies. After her funeral, Rajinikanth sombrely leaves the orphanage.

Cast 
 Rajinikanth as himself
 Meena as Rosy
 Ambika as Lalitha
 Rajkumar Sethupathi as Raju
 Tinku as J. C. Peter
 Sulakshana as Stella
 Manimala
 Uma as Siriya Pushpam
 Y. G. Mahendran
 Senthamarai as Lalitha's father
 Vadivukkarasi as Lalitha's mother
 Kamala Kamesh
 Usilai Mani

Guest appearances
 Jaishankar as himself
 K. Bhagyaraj as himself
 Raadhika as herself
 S. P. Muthuraman as himself
 R. Parthiban as Bhagyaraj's assistant director
 K. Natraj as passport officer

Production 
Producer Azhagan Thamizhmani and writer Thooyavan saw a film called Touched by Love (also known as To Elvis, with Love), in 1980 which had Elvis Presley in a guest appearance at a film festival, both got emotional while watching the film, which prompted them to attempt a similar story in Tamil. Thooyavan finished writing the screenplay within a month. He wanted to cast M. G. Ramachandran as the hero, but could not do so. Thooyavan narrated the story to K. Natraj who was working as one of the assistant directors in Devar Films. Natraj agreed to work on the film and Rajinikanth accepted to act in the film for free of charge. Rajinikanth initially agreed to give callsheet of 6 days then extended for 10 days since he wanted the film to come out well. The film was entirely shot in a school with 300 students. Rajkumar Sethupathi, brother of actress Latha and husband of actress Sripriya did a small role as Ambika's husband. Meena appeared as one of the main characters. A scene where Rosy visits Rajinikanth's house for tea was filmed at the actual location. The budget of the film was 2.3 million.

Soundtrack 
The music was composed by Ilaiyaraaja.

Release and reception 

Anbulla Rajinikanth was released on 2 August 1984. The following day, The Hindu said, "For one making his debut as director Natraj deserves accolades for the near-to-the-heart treatment of the situations in which the performance of a six-member-group of orphans will make even elder artistes sit up" and concluded, "Babu's camera embellishes the frames". Despite receiving positive reviews, the film was a box-office bomb.

Legacy 
The film's title inspired two unrelated films: Anbulla Kamal, the Tamil-dubbed version of the Malayalam film Four Friends (2010), and Anbulla Ghilli (2020).

References

Bibliography

External links 
 

1980s children's drama films
1980s Tamil-language films
1984 directorial debut films
1984 films
Films scored by Ilaiyaraaja
Indian children's drama films